William Pemble (Pember) (1591 or 1592–1623) was an English theologian and author.

Biography
A student of Richard Capel at Magdalen College, Oxford, Pemble became reader and tutor at Magdalen. All of Pemble's works were published posthumously.

Works
Vindiciae fidei, 1625
Vindiciae gratiae, 1627
Salomons Recantation and Repentance, 1627
An Introduction to the Worthy Receiving the Sacrament, 1628
De formarum origine, 1629
De sensibus internis, 1629
A Short and Sweet Exposition upon the First Nine Chapters of Zachary, 1629
A Summe of Morall Philosophy, 1630
A Briefe Introduction to Geography, 1630
Tractatus de providentia Dei, 1631
The Period of the Persian Monarchie , 1631

External links
 Richard L. Greaves, ‘Pemble, William (1591/2–1623)’, Oxford Dictionary of National Biography, Oxford University Press, 2004, accessed 25 Oct 2007
 
 
 
 

1590s births
1623 deaths
English theologians
Fellows of Magdalen College, Oxford